Harsha Pala was son of Go Pala, the ruler of Pala Dynasty of Kamarupa Kingdom and Queen Nayana. He ruled for the period 1015-1035 A.D.

Copper plate description of Dharma Pala states that famous and spirited king Go Pala had a wife of the 
name of Nayana of noble reputation. She bore a son the illustrious Harsha Pala who was like the lamp of the Pala line and whose reputation spread over the three worlds.

References

Further reading
   
 
 
 
 
 
 
 
 
 
 
 
 

Pala dynasty (Kamarupa)
11th-century Indian monarchs